Beth Willman is an American astronomer who is the Executive Officer of the LSST (Large Synoptic Survey Telescope) Corporation, an astronomical organization notable for its support of the Vera C. Rubin Observatory. She was previously the deputy director of the National Optical-Infrared Astronomy Research Laboratory (NOIRLab) and an associate professor of astronomy at Haverford College.

Education 
Beth Willman received her B.A. in astrophysics at Columbia University. In 2003 she received a Ph.D. in astronomy from the University of Washington. Her doctoral advisor was Julianne Dalcanton and her thesis was on Milky Way dwarf satellite galaxies. Beth Willman has also been a James Arthur Fellow at New York University's Center for Cosmology and Particle Physics, and a Clay Fellow at the Center for Astrophysics  Harvard & Smithsonian.

Research 
Beth mainly focuses her research on cosmology. Her specialty is investigating the least luminous galaxies in our known Universe. The galaxy Willman 1, which she discovered during her postdoc, is named after her.

References

External links
 

Haverford College faculty
American women astronomers
University of Washington alumni
Living people
Year of birth missing (living people)
Columbia College (New York) alumni